1G is the first-generation wireless telephone technology.

1G or 1-G may also refer to:
 Metallothionein 1G
 1g Racing, manufacturer of the Rossion Q1 sports car
 Astra 1G, a satellite operated by SES
 SSH 1G (WA) or Washington State Route 538
 Galileo International's IATA code
 1G, a model of Toyota G engine

See also
 G-force
 Gram
 Cardiomyopathy, dilated 1G (autosomal dominant)
 G1 (disambiguation)
 G (disambiguation)